Jeff Freundlich is an American songwriter, producer and music industry executive. His music is heard in network, cable and syndicated TV shows, in major and independent films, and advertising campaigns.

A native of New York City, Freundlich graduated cum laude from Lehigh University in Bethlehem, Pennsylvania, in 1998. Freundlich served as an analyst at Andersen Consulting (now called Accenture) from 1998–1999, he was a Marketing Manager for Net2Phone in Hackensack, New Jersey, from 1999–2002.

In 2002, Freundlich teamed with David Hilker and John Costello III, the owners of Phoenix, AZ recording studio, Wild Whirled Recording. The team formed Wild Whirled Music, which licenses copyrighted music content to all forms of electronic media. Wild Whirled Music represents Wild Whirled Music Catalog, Trailerville Music, Muzik Headz and independent label Fervor Records.

Freundlich serves as COO for Wild Whirled Music, Muzik Headz, and Executive Producer for Fervor Records. All companies are based in, Phoenix, AZ. Wild Whirled currently oversees the music publishing assets of the following catalogs:
 Music Whirled Publishing, Inc., BMI
 Mount Pilot Music Publishing, BMI
 Mighty Music, BMI
 Renda Music, BMI
 Desert Palm, BMI
 Trailerville Music, BMI
 Cue Sheet Music, BMI
 Earthcake Publishing, BMI
 BIGBUZZ Music, BMI
 Ultra Urban Music, ASCAP
 Two Skullz Muzik Publishing, ASCAP
 Vintage Masters Music, ASCAP

Distribution
Publishing catalogs are distributed internationally by:
 Villasara Music House Italy
 Sony/ATV Music Publishing France & Belgium
 Musou Music Greece
 Boosey & Hawkes, UK
 Audio Factory, GMBH, Germany, Austria and Switzerland
 Wild Whirled Music, North America
 7 Out Music, North America

Select discography as writer, performer and producer
 Pure House - 2 da Groove, Fervor Records (2007) - writer
 Nu R&B - Various Artists, Fervor Records (2007) -  writer
 Fervor Divas Sing The Ballads - Various Artists, Fervor Records (2007) -  writer, producer
 Howell/Freundlich Overdrive - self-titled, Fervor Records (2008) -  writer, producer, vocalist
 Change We Can Believe In - Juice Monkey, Fervor Records (2008) - writer, producer, vocalist
 Greatest Hits of the 70s - Smooth Double J, Fervor Records (2008) - writer, producer, vocalist
 Christmas Fervor - Various Artists, Fervor Records (2008) - writer, producer, vocalist
 1st Collection - Brill Street Collective, Fervor Records (2009) - writer, producer, vocalist, percussionist
 Suicide Machine - Kaige & the Pubes, Fervor Records (2009) - writer, producer, vocalist

Notable credits 
Freundlich has placed music with shows on every major USA TV network including:
A&E Network, ABC Television, ABC Family, AMC (TV network), Animal Planet, Bravo (US TV channel), CBS, CHUM Limited, Comedy Central, CTV Television Network, Discovery Channel, Discovery Health Channel, Disney, E!, Fit TV, Fox, FSN, Fuel, FX (TV network), Global Television Network, Hallmark Channel, HBO, HGTV, Lifetime Television, MTV, MTV2, NBC, Noggin (TV channel), Oxygen (TV network), Playboy, Sci Fi Channel (United States), Showtime, Soap Opera Network, SPEED (TV channel), Spike (TV channel), Style Network, Starz (TV network), TBS (TV network), Tech TV, The CW, The WB, TLC (TV channel), Turner Network Television, Travel Channel, Univision, UPN, USA Network, VH1 and WE tv.

ABC
 Ugly Betty
 Brothers & Sisters
 Boston Legal
 Men In Trees
 In Case of Emergency
 Freddie
 George Lopez
 Rodney
 The Drew Carey Show
 Good Morning America

CBS
 The Mentalist
 Numb3rs
 Big Brother
 Flashpoint
 Without A Trace
 Criminal Minds
 Cold Case
 CSI: Miami
 CSI: NY
 Navy NCIS
 The Unit
 Ghost Whisperer
 JAG
 The Handler

NBC
 Southland
 The Listener
 My Name Is Earl
 The Office
 Las Vegas
 Crossing Jordan
 Surface
 Law & Order
 Law & Order: SVU
 Law & Order: CI
 E-Ring
 ER
 Scrubs
 Friends
 Medical Investigation

Fox
 House
 Standoff
 Vanished
 Reunion
 The War at Home
 King of the Hill
 The Simple Life
 Fox NFL Sunday
 Malcolm In The Middle

The CW
 America's Next Top Model
 Supernatural
 Valentine
 Reaper
 Easy Money
 Everybody Hates Chris
 Gilmore Girls
 Veronica Mars
 Smallville
 One Tree Hill
 Crazy Ex-Girlfriend

HBO
 The Sopranos
 Big Love
 Empire Falls

Oxygen
 Bad Girls Road Trip

TLC
 Miami Ink
 LA Ink

TV themes
 Build Or Bust Speed Channel
 The Chris Myers Interview, FSN
 Arena Football League, FSN
 Total Access 24/7, ABC Family
 Mark Henry's 8th theme WWE
 Brainstorm, KTVK

Films
 The Silencing(2020 film)
 Preacher's Kid
 Paul Blart Mall Cop
 The Love Guru
 The Messenger
 I Love You Man
 She's Out Of My League
 The Private Lives of Pippa Lee
 Sex Drive
 The Answer Man
 All About Steve
 The Six Wives of Henry Lefay
 Greta
 A Dog Year
 Midgets Vs. Mascots
 AMREEKA
 Meet Monica Velour
 Happy Tears
 The Lost Coast
 Nancy Drew
 Eragon
 I Think I Love My Wife
 Phat Girlz
 The Saloon
 Everyday People
 Harold & Kumar Go to White Castle
 American Wedding
 Surviving Christmas
 August Rush
 Kickin' It Old Skool
 Broken English
 Species: The Awakening
 Wieners
 Byline
 DOA: Dead Or Alive
 Thought Crimes
 Butterfly Effect 2
 Her Best Move
 Harsh Times
 Vegas Baby
 Wasabi Tuna
 Latin Dragon
 Road Trip: 24 Hours In Vegas
 Bathgate Avenue
 Nora's Hair Salon
 The Dying Gaul

References 
 http://repertoire.bmi.com/publisher.asp?blnWriter=True&blnPublisher=True&blnArtist=True&keyID=232045&keyname=MIGHTY%20MUSIC&querytype=PubID
 http://repertoire.bmi.com/publisher.asp?blnWriter=True&blnPublisher=True&blnArtist=True&keyID=849032&keyname=MUSIC%20WHIRLED%20PUBLISHING&querytype=PubID
 http://repertoire.bmi.com/publisher.asp?blnWriter=True&blnPublisher=True&blnArtist=True&keyID=284807&keyname=RENDA%20MUSIC&querytype=PubID
 http://repertoire.bmi.com/publisher.asp?blnWriter=True&blnPublisher=True&blnArtist=True&keyID=1073280&keyname=CUE%20SHEET%20MUSIC&querytype=PubID
 http://www.linkedin.com/ppl/webprofile?action=vmi&id=4858297&authToken=SqXp&authType=name&trk=ppro_viewmore&lnk=vw_pprofile
 http://www.taxi.com/rally/rally2006a.html
 https://web.archive.org/web/20061007025123/http://phoenix.gov/NEWSREL/ARCHIVE/2005/JANUARY/songs.html
 https://web.archive.org/web/20071202190621/http://www.strandreleasing.com/pressroom/Presskits/DyingGaulPK.pdf
 https://web.archive.org/web/20090107013600/http://www.gabrielfleming.com/TLC/images/The_Lost_Coast_Press_Kit.pdf
 http://www.imdb.com/title/tt0355836/soundtrack
 http://www.imdb.com/title/tt0404390/soundtrack
 https://archive.today/20130114055802/http://german.imdb.co.uk/title/tt0772178/soundtrack
 http://www.imdb.com/title/tt0441007/soundtrack

Writers from Phoenix, Arizona
Living people
Lehigh University alumni
Musicians from Phoenix, Arizona
Songwriters from New York (state)
Record producers from New York (state)
Record producers from Arizona
Songwriters from Arizona
Year of birth missing (living people)